Take Me to Your Leader is the sixth studio album by Christian pop rock band Newsboys, released in 1996. It was both the last Newsboys album to feature lead vocalist John James and the first to feature bassist/vocalist Phil Joel. The album won a Dove Award in 1997 for its packaging, and was also nominated for "Rock Album of the Year", "Rock Recorded Song of the Year" ("God Is Not a Secret") and "Short Form Music Video of the Year" (for "Take Me to Your Leader"). The album was also recognized with a Grammy nomination for "Best Rock Gospel Album". It is also the band's the first album as a sextet.

The vehicle pictured is an X-PAK 400, created by George Barris in the early 1960s during the Battle of Air Cars.  This car appears on a stage in "Hangover" (season 1, episode 12 of the Alfred Hitchcock Hour).  Also in this episode, actor Tony Randall, as Hadley Purvis, says the phrase "Take me to your leader."

Reception

Track listing

Music videos
 "Take Me to Your Leader"

Radio singles
Aside from "Miracle Child," which was not released as a radio single, every track from Take Me to Your Leader became a top ten hit on at least one of CCM Magazine's Christian charts (either the CHR, adult contemporary, or rock format).

<small>Note: all ''CCM Magazine chart information is available in the book Hot Hits CHR 1978-1997 (1997) by Jeffrey Lee Brothers</small>

 Personnel Newsboys John James – lead vocals, backing vocals
 Peter Furler – drums, lead vocals, backing vocals, guitar, keyboards, harmonica, kazoo, whistling
 Jody Davis – guitar, backing vocals
 Duncan Phillips – percussion
 Jeff Frankenstein – keyboards
 Phil Joel – bass, lead vocals, backing vocals, whistlingProduction Peter Furler – producer
 Steve Taylor – producer, engineer 
 Wes Campbell – executive producer, management, vocal recording (5)
 Darrell Harris – executive producer
 Russ Long – vocal recording (5)
 Jeff Nolte – vocal recording (5), production manager 
 Steve Broadway – recording assistant 
 John Caudill – recording assistant 
 Annette Cisneros – recording assistant 
 Dennis Desmet – recording assistant
 Mitch Eaton – recording assistant 
 Scott Feltheim – recording assistant 
 Brian Jerden – recording assistant
 Shane Johnson – recording assistant 
 Tim Jordan – recording assistant
 William Stace – recording assistant 
 Cindy Sutton – recording assistant 
 Jamie Tate – recording assistant 
 Tom Lord-Alge – mixing
 Mauricio Iragorri – mix assistant 
 Pete Martinez – mix assistant
 Juan Rosario – mix assistant
 Cesar Sogbe – mix assistant
 Bob Ludwig – mastering at Gateway Mastering, Portland, Maine
 Debby Austin – project coordinator 
 Toni Fitzpenn – art direction 
 Joel Anderson – design 
 George Barris – cover photography 
 Michael Wilson – band photography 
 Norman Jean Roy – additional photography Studios'''
 The Sanctuary, Nashville, Tennessee – recording location
 The Carport, Nashville, Tennessee – recording location
 El Dorado Recording Studios, Hollywood, California – recording location
 Steve's Studio, Stillwater, Oklahoma – recording location
 Walls Have Ears Studio, Milwaukee, Wisconsin – recording location
 Sixteenth Ave. Sound, Nashville, Tennessee – mixing  location
 South Beach Studios, Miami Beach, Florida – mixing  location
 Encore Studios, Burbank, California – mixing  location

References

Newsboys albums
1996 albums